Slatina is a village located in the Plovdiv Province, South Central Bulgaria and is part of the Karlovo Municipality. 

The village is situated on the northern foothills of the Sredna Gora facing the Karlovo valley and the Balkan mountains. The river Stryama flows in the vicinity of Slatina. It is located at 103 km to the east of the capital Sofia.

Honour
Slatina Peak on Smith Island, South Shetland Islands is named after Slatina (Plovdiv Province) and few homonymous Bulgarian settlements.

Footnotes

Villages in Plovdiv Province